Events in the year 1967 in Brazil.

Incumbents

Federal government
 President: Marshal Castelo Branco (until 14 March), Marshal Artur da Costa e Silva (starting 15 March)
 Vice-President: José Maria Alkmin (until 14 March), Pedro Aleixo (starting 15 March)

Governors 
 Acre: vacant
 Alagoas: Antônio Simeão de Lamenha Filho 
 Amazonas: Danilo Duarte de Matos Areosa
 Bahia: Lomanto Junior then Luís Viana Filho 
 Ceará: Plácido Castelo
 Espírito Santo: Rubens Rangel (until 31 January); Cristiano Dias Lopes Filho (from 31 January)
 Goiás: Otávio Lage
 Guanabara: Francisco Negrão de Lima 
 Maranhão: Jose Sarney 
 Mato Grosso: Pedro Pedrossian 
 Minas Gerais: Israel Pinheiro da Silva 
 Pará: Alacid Nunes 
 Paraíba: João Agripino Maia 
 Paraná: Pablo Cruz Pimentel 
 Pernambuco: Paulo Pessoa Guerra (until 31 January); Nilo Coelho (from 31 January)
 Piauí: Helvídio Nunes
 Rio de Janeiro: Geremias de Mattos Fontes
 Rio Grande do Norte: Walfredo Gurgel Dantas 
 Rio Grande do Sul: Walter Peracchi Barcelos 
 Santa Catarina: Ivo Silveira 
 São Paulo: Roberto Costa de Abreu Sodré 
 Sergipe: Lourival Baptista

Vice governors
 Alagoas: Manoel Sampaio Luz 
 Amazonas: Rui Arajuo (from 31 January)
 Bahia: Orlando Moscoso (until 15 March); Jutahy Magalhães (from 15 March)
 Ceará: Humberto Ellery
 Espírito Santo: Isaac Lopes Rubim 
 Goiás: Osires Teixeira 
 Maranhão: Antonio Jorge Dino
 Mato Grosso: Lenine de Campos Póvoas 
 Minas Gerais: Pio Soares Canedo 
 Pará: João Renato Franco 
 Paraíba: Antônio Juarez Farias 
 Paraná: Plínio Franco Ferreira da Costa 
 Pernambuco: Salviano Machado Filho 
 Piauí: João Clímaco d'Almeida 
 Rio de Janeiro: Heli Ribeiro Gomes
 Rio Grande do Norte: Clóvis Motta
 Santa Catarina: Jorge Bornhausen (from 9 March)
 São Paulo: Hilário Torloni 
 Sergipe: vacant

Events
 24 January – The military regime promulgates the country's sixth Constitution.
 26 January – The president-elect Artur da Costa e Silva visits U.S. president Lyndon Johnson at the White House.
 9 February – New laws regulating the media, including the press, radio and television companies, are signed.
 13 February – Implementation of cruzeiro novo, the country's new currency.
 6 to 13 September – King Olav V of Norway visits Brazil.
 5 December – FUNAI is created.

Births
 8 January – Guilherme Fontes, actor
 6 March – Sérgio Pereira Couto, Portuguese-Brazilian writer
 1 July – Marisa Monte, singer
 1 August – José Padilha, film director, producer and screenwriter
 5 November – Marcelo D2, rapper 
 13 November 
 Vitor Negrete, mountaineer (died 2006)
 Ricardo Nunes, politician 
 14 December – Palhinha, footballer
Unknown date – Roberto Santucci, filmmaker

Deaths
 26 February – Octacílio, footballer (born 1909)
 18 July – Humberto de Alencar Castelo Branco, politician (born 1897)
 19 July – Luz del Fuego, ballerina, naturist and feminist (born 1917 as Dora Vivacqua) 
 19 November – João Guimarães Rosa, novelist (born 1908)

References

See also 
1967 in Brazilian football
1967 in Brazilian television

 
1960s in Brazil
Years of the 20th century in Brazil
Brazil
Brazil